Hwang Yun-suk (1929–1961) was the first female judge in South Korea.

Career
Hwang graduated from Jinmyeong Girls' High School, and went on to study in the Faculty of Law at Seoul National University. She passed the third annual  in 1952.

South Korea's first female court clerk, Park Gyeong-sun, began working for Hwang in 1960.

Death and legacy
Hwang was found dead on the morning of 21 April 1961. There is speculation she was killed by her in-laws or her husband.

The Yun-suk Scholarship was established in her memory at her alma mater Jinmyeong Girls' High School in April 1962, on the first anniversary of her death, with an endowment of ₩1.5 million.

References

1929 births
1961 deaths
South Korean judges
South Korean women judges
Seoul National University alumni
South Korean prosecutors